Thurles Town Football Club is an Irish association football club based in Thurles, County Tipperary. Their senior team  play in the North Tipperary District League. Thurles Town A.F.C. was formed in 1950. In 1977 they merged with Peake Villa to become Thurles Town F.C. and in order to enter a team in the League of Ireland. Thurles Town played in the League of Ireland from 1977–78 until 1981–82. Their best performance was a ninth-place finish in 1979–80. Throughout their time in the League of Ireland, Thurles Town also competed in the FAI Cup. However they never progressed beyond the first round they played in. When Thurles Town withdrew from the League of Ireland in 1982, Peake Villa returned to play in the Kilkenny League and the Tipperary Southern and District League.

Notable former players

Republic of Ireland internationals
  Pat Dunne
  Alfie Hale

League of Ireland XI representatives
  Terry Flanagan
  Jimmy McGeough

Goalscorers
  Neville Steedman: 1979–80 – 17

League of Ireland managers
  Mick Cooke

Former managers
  Jimmy McGeough: 1977–1978
  Sean Sheehy: 1978
  Pat Dunne: 1978–80?
  John Doran: 1980–81?
  Alfie Hale: 1981–1982

References

External links
 www.thurlestownfc.ie

Former League of Ireland clubs
Association football clubs in County Tipperary
Association football clubs established in 1950
1950 establishments in Ireland
Sport in Thurles